Sadeq Al Naihoum (1937 – 15 November 1994) was a Libyan writer and journalist.

Early life and education
He was born in Benghazi, Libya, in 1937 where he lived and studied until he finished his university degree in literature. He then lived in Egypt, Germany and Finland between 1963 and 1971.

Career
Naihoum began writing in the newspaper Haqiqa Weekly in the 1960s while he was studying and working in Helsinki. His socio-political articles raised much debate at the time, and until his death in Geneva in 1994. He was distinguished by his daring satire, and during the 1960s his articles were widely read. The subjects he wrote about continue to raise a lot of debate in the Arab cultural circles of today.

Death
After suffering from lung cancer for two years, Naihoum died on 15 November 1994 in Geneva. He is buried in Benghazi.

References

1937 births
1994 deaths
Libyan writers
Libyan journalists
People from Benghazi
20th-century journalists